The St. Ivel International was an annual international figure skating competition at the Richmond Ice Rink in England. Sponsored by the National Ice Skating Association, it included competitions in men's singles, ladies' singles, pairs, and ice dancing. In most years it was held in late September or early October.

History 
The competition was first held in 1978 under the name Rotary Watches International and was renamed in 1980 when it became sponsored by the St. Ivel dairy product brand. In 1988, the event was renamed to (or replaced by) Skate Electric, which in some years was held in both spring and fall versions. The competition originally scheduled for October 1991 was cancelled due to loss of sponsorship, and the British federation has not held another annual senior international competition in the years since.

The event was considered one of the more prestigious international competitions of the 1980s, comparable to events such as Skate America and NHK Trophy which later became part of the ISU Grand Prix of Figure Skating.

Medalists

Men

Ladies

Pairs

Ice dancing

References 

 fskate.ru

Figure skating competitions
Figure skating in the United Kingdom